Peucedanum verticillare, common name giant hog fennel or milk parsley, is a herbaceous plant in the genus Peucedanum of the family Apiaceae.

Description

The stems are glaucous purple, erect, stout (1–2 cm in diameter) and finely striated, with 2-3 large flattened umbels with 12-20 rays bearing small greenish white flowers. These huge and showy umbellifers have a basal bushy rosette of finely cut glossy dark-green leaves, beetroot-red when they are young. The flowering period extends from June through August in their native habitat.

Giant Hog Fennel is a biennial or short-lived perennial that needs two-five years to reach maturity. These plants are deciduous and die after flowering and producing seeds. As the seeds germinate quite easily, usually many seedlings grow all around the previous plant. This plant is toxic if ingested.

Distribution
This species is widespread in south-eastern Europe up to Asia.

Habitat
Peucedanum verticillare is commonly present in riverbeds, the banks of streams, stony grounds and ravines.

Gallery

References
 Pignatti S. - Flora d'Italia – Edagricole – 1982, Vol. II, pag. 232
 Tutin, T.G. et al. - Flora Europaea, second edition - 1993
 Species Wikimedia

External links
 Biolib
 Peucedanum-verticillare
 Botanica
 Shoot Gardening

verticillare